The Central Bank of West African States (BCEAO) is a central bank serving the eight west African countries which share the common West African CFA franc currency and comprise the West African Economic and Monetary Union (UEMOA).

The Bank is active in developing financial inclusion policy and is a member of the Alliance for Financial Inclusion.

Member states

History
The treaty establishing the West African Monetary Union (UMOA), signed on May 12, 1962, gave BCEAO the exclusive right to issue currency as the common central bank for the, then, seven member countries:

Ivory Coast
Dahomey (modern day Benin)
Haute-Volta (modern day Burkina Faso)
Mali
Mauritania
Niger
Senegal

On June 30, 1962 Mali left the group and adopted the Malian franc as national currency. On December 17, 1963 Togo officially joined the UMOA. On May 30, 1973 Mauritania withdrew and adopted the ouguiya as national currency. On February 17, 1984, Mali re-joined the UMOA.

Governors
Robert Julienne, 1959-1974
Abdoulaye Fadiga, 1974-1988
Alassane Ouattara, 1988-1990
Charles Konan Banny, 1990-2005
Justin Damo Baro, 2006-2008
Philippe-Henri Dakoury-Tabley, 2008-2011
Jean-Baptiste Compaoré, 2011
Tiémoko Meyliet Koné, 2011-2022
Jean-Claude Brou, 2022-

See also

 Banque des Etats de l'Afrique Centrale (BEAC)
 Banque de l'Afrique Occidentale (BAO) 1901-1962
 Central banks and currencies of Africa
 Economy of Benin
 Economy of Burkina Faso
 Economy of Guinea-Bissau
 Economy of Ivory Coast
 Economy of Mali
 Economy of Niger
 Economy of Senegal
 Economy of Togo
 Payment system
 Real-time gross settlement

References

External links
  Official site: 

West African Economic and Monetary Union
Banks of Benin
Banks of Burkina Faso
Banks of Ivory Coast
Banks of Guinea-Bissau
Banks of Mali
Banks of Niger
Banks of Senegal
Banks of Togo
Banks established in 1959